The Federal Rural University of Amazonia (UFRA) is a Brazilian public University located in Belem, Pará, Brazil

History 
The UFRA has marked its origin in the School of Agronomy of Amazon, created in 1945, which was born with the purpose of preparing agronomists of the North of Brazil, It started operating in 1951, and already in the 1960 consolidated as a training institution for Human Resources in Agricultural Sciences.

In 1972 the School of Agronomy Amazon was called Faculty of Agricultural Sciences of Pará (FCAP) in order to better meet the demand for training human resources in the Amazon. In 1974, FCAP was created in the first veterinary hospital in the northern region.

In 2002, the decree that transformed the FCAP in Federal Rural University of Amazonia was signed.

Currently the institution offers undergraduate courses in management, agronomy, biology, accounting, computer science, agricultural engineering, environmental engineering, cartographic engineering, fishing engineering, production engineering, forestry engineering, computer science, literature – sign language, veterinary medicine, animal science and information systems.

In addition to the 16 courses, UFRA has graduate programs in the areas of agricultural sciences, tropical aquaculture and aquatic resources, forestry sciences, animal production and health, life sciences, applied to agricultural biotechnology. The UFRA headquarters is located in Belém, Para, on the river Guamá, and also has five campuses in the state, they are: Paragominas, Paraupebas, Capitão Poço, Capanema and Tomé-Açu.

See also
 Federal University of Pará
 Pará State University
 Federal Institute of Pará
 Ministry of Education (Brazil)

References

External links

UFRA

Federal universities of Brazil
Universities and colleges in Pará